is a Japanese manga series written and illustrated by Yoshitoki Ōima. The series was originally published as a one-shot in Kodansha's Bessatsu Shōnen Magazine and was later serialized in Weekly Shōnen Magazine from August 2013 to November 2014. Its chapters were collected in seven tankōbon volumes. The manga was digitally released in English by Crunchyroll Manga and was licensed by Kodansha USA in North America. An anime theatrical film adaptation produced by Kyoto Animation was released in September 2016.

Plot
In sixth grade, Shoya Ishida leads the class in bullying Shoko Nishimiya, a classmate who is new to the school and is deaf. When Shoya's actions are finally condemned by the principal, all of his friends and teachers turn against him, socially isolating him well into high school to the point that he eventually considers suicide, which he believes would absolve him of his bad deeds. To make amends, he reunites with Shoko, who is still lonely due to her shyness. Realizing that both are suffering due to his past sins, Shoya sets out on a path of redemption by trying to reconnect Shoko with their old classmates that Shoko never had the chance to befriend back then, including Shoya's former comrade, Naoka Ueno, who holds a grudge against Shoko for "causing" Shoya's isolation; Miki Kawai, their narcissistic former class president; and Miyoko Sahara, a kind girl who was the only one attempting to befriend Shoko years before. They also make new friends in Tomohiro Nagatsuka, a similarly friendless fat boy who owes Shoya; and Satoshi Mashiba, Miki's crush.

The seven begin to work together when Tomohiro's plan to create a film for a competition, which he plans to only include Shoya and himself, attracts the attention of Naoka, Miki, Tomohiro and Satoshi, with Shoya additionally inviting Shoko to join the project. While filming, the seven face their personal challenges and conflicts. Shoko eventually tries to confess her love to Shoya, but it does not get through to him and ends up in a misunderstanding.
The group also has a falling out when Shoya tries to isolate himself again by insulting the crew, leading to Shoko feeling sorry for him. As she believes she is the sole reason for the parting of the group, Shoko attempts to kill herself and is rescued by Shoya, who gets badly hurt in the process, falling into a coma. This impacts the other six of the group as they start to resolve their problems while suspending the project until Shoya awakens. Once he recovers, Shoya reconciles with his film crew and finally completes the film, which, while a failure, has greatly helped him and his friends.

A year after their high school graduation and their subsequent parting ways, the seven reunite for the Coming of Age Day. By then, Shoya has stopped ignoring the people around him and now has a lot of friends. At the end of the Age Day, Shoya and Shoko are seen going into their elementary school reunion together holding hands so that Shoko will feel less nervous.

Characters

The main character and narrator. In elementary school, he leads his class in bullying Shoko for her deafness. When the bullying gets the attention of higher school authorities, the class turns Shoya into a scapegoat so they will not have to also take responsibility. As a result, he becomes ostracized and bullied by his former friends. Shoya starts to ignore those around him (imagining them with a large blue X across their face). Upon meeting her in high school, he eventually apologizes to Shoko, becoming fluent in sign language specifically to do so, and begins to spend time with her. Shoya feels like he has not been punished enough for bullying Shoko and often wishes he could have stopped his younger self. He also feels resigned to the fact that he will never be able to have friends again. As the series progresses, Shoya and Shoko reconnect with their former classmates, in the process making amends with them and facing the lingering effects from each other's past.

The other main character, Shoko, is a deaf girl who is bullied by Shoya in elementary school to the point of needing to transfer. Years later, Shoya searches for her to apologize. Although Shoko holds a bit of resentment towards him, she accepts his apology and starts to spend time with him. She almost never gets angry with her attackers and even smiles at them; though some characters, in particular Ueno, get very annoyed by this and accuse her of faking them. She often blames herself for being bullied or thinks she is a burden to others, leading to depressive or suicidal mindsets, and struggles with forgiving herself. After a while, Shoko falls in love with Shoya and, at one point, tries to declare this. However, due to her speech impediment, he fails to understand her. At the end of the manga/movie, after having studied in Tokyo for a while, Shoko returns to her hometown and reunites with Shoya for the Coming of Age Day.
 
A girl from Shoya and Shoko's elementary school who allowed Shoya to bully Shoko. She continues to be friends with many of their classmates, after they separate themselves from Shoya. Ueno watches Shoya becoming a loner throughout middle school and believes their sadness, from her having to cut off contact with Shoya to him hating everyone, including her, has all been because of Shoko. She runs into Shoya years later and tries to reintroduce him to past classmates. Ueno has a crush on Shoya, when they were children, which cause her to become jealous and resentful towards Shouko. Despite being within the group of friends, Shoya still does not trust her until after his release from the hospital, when she finally apologizes to him for all she did wrong. After graduation, Ueno is dragged by Sahara to become her assistant as a model. By the epilogue, it is shown that her time in Tokyo has somewhat diminished her mean personality, though it still exists.
 
Nicknamed "Kawaiichi", Kawai is the school representative at Shoya's elementary school. She is popular and normally takes charge of situations. She has a kind facade, but is secretly a narcissist, believing that everyone should love her, and wants to be the victim in every problem she faces. Though she does not directly bully Shouko, Kawai does nothing to intervene and even laughs alongside her friends. She leads the class in scapegoating Shoya after Shoko's transfer, leading to his isolation. In high school, Kawai joins Shoya's friend group, bringing Mashiba, whom she has a crush on, along. Instead of facing that she contributed to Shoko's bullying, she once again uses Shoya as a scapegoat and plays the victim, leading to him falling out of his new friend group. However, the consequences fall back on her when her classmates become disgusted and bully her after she suggests they make paper cranes as a wish of recovery for Shoya, who is hospitalized after saving Shouko. Having experienced getting bullied for the first time, Kawai resolves to become more empathetic with others. Near the end of the series, she decides to follow Mashiba to take up teaching classes.

A kind girl from Shoya and Shoko's elementary school. She is the only student willing to make an effort to learn sign language and befriend Shoko. However, this singles her out for bullying, causing her to take the rest of her classes in the nurse's office. Shoya finds Sahara several years later so she can reconnect with Shoko and become her friend again. Sahara has grown very tall and, due to her high heel boots, appears even taller. After Shoya, Sahara spends the most time Shoko's family. However, their relationship is briefly strained when Shoya decides to cut ties with his friends by insulting them, claiming that Sahara is always the first to run away from a problem. Sahara later texts Shoya asking how he could prove that he has grown up, if he cut ties with his friends for no reason. Fed up of Ueno always blaming Shouko for everything, she chooses to take Shouko's side and defends her from being attacked by Ueno during Shoya's hospitalization. After graduating from high school, Sahara goes to Tokyo to become a runway model, bringing Ueno with her.
 
Shoko's protective younger sister and a middle school student. When her mother attempted to cut a young Shouko's hair short to look like a boy and appear tougher, Yuzuru started portraying herself as a boy on Shoko's behalf to defend her, and initially introduces herself to Shoya as Shouko's boyfriend. Yuzuru is extremely protective of her big sister and has a deep hatred of all the people who ever bullied her, such as Shoya. However, upon learning that Shoya has changed, she mellows down and helps him reunite with his old classmates. Yuzuru often ditches school and runs away from home to take photos of dead animals and insects, putting strain between her relationship with her mother. It is revealed that she only took these photos to show her sister how horrible death is and not try to kill herself. This is proven to be a futile effort, however, as Shoko attempts to commit suicide, but she is rescued by Shoya in the last minute. Yuzuru later pursues photography and wins a photo contest.

A short, fat and lonely boy at Shoya's high school. When someone tries to steal his bike, Shoya offers his to be taken instead. Nagatsuka sees this act of kindness as an unbreakable act of friendship and proclaims himself Shoya's best friend. He is shown to be quite obsessive and protective of Shoya, and sometimes dislikes him befriending other people. However, Nagatsuka is also supportive of Shoya and often offers advice. He and Yuzuru try to encourage Shoya and Shouko to go out with each other, and are often disappointed by Shoya's repulsion towards romance. He has plans to become a millionaire, so he is willing to hand out money to friends, and is keen to become a film director, entering himself and Shoya into a film competition. Though his film proves to be a failure, this only makes Nagatsuka resolve to take up film studies as his college degree.

A boy who is interested in and joins Shoya's group of friends upon learning they are making a film. Mashiba was lonely as a child and the other children took him for granted and bullied him. Now, he is completely intolerant of bullies in any form and, while generally calm and level headed, reacts violently to any random act of bullying he sees. He ignores Kawai's crush on him until Shoya points it out. After finding out about Shoya's bullying history, he calmly punches Shoya in the face. It is later revealed that Mashiba befriended Shoya because of his social awkwardness and never being able to fit in at school despite trying to; by hanging out with Shoya, whom he believed is even stranger than he is, he would appear normal. However, this only makes him feel that he should be the least important amongst the group. Mashiba is the first to reconcile with Shoya upon his release from hospital and later studies to become a teacher after graduation.

Shouko and Yuzuru's mother. A cold woman, she caught a virus from her husband, when she was pregnant with Shoko, leaving her deaf. Her husband filed for divorce when she was pregnant with Yuzuru, leaving her to raise her daughters as a single mother, though she was offered help by her mother, Ito. Eventually, Ito took care of the children permanently while Yaeko worked, creating a distance between Yaeko and her daughters. She prolongs Shoko's time at elementary school, where she is bullied in the hopes it would toughen her up and prepare her for how people would treat her. She hates Shoya and feels he cannot atone for the happy school years he stole from her daughter. Upon seeing him again years after Shouko's transfer, she slaps him. However, after her mother's death, she begins to warm up to Shoya and thanks him for being Yuzuru's friend.

Shouko and Yuzuru's maternal grandmother. A caring, wise woman, she raised Shoko and Yuzuru after their father left, as their mother, Yaeko, had to take up full-time work. She bought Yuzuru her first camera and tries to convince her that her mother means well for both her and her sister. Ito dies of old age, leaving a letter that Yuzuru asks Shoya to read at the funeral. The letter tries one last time to convince Yuzuru to forgive her mother, but she grows angry and does not hear the end of it.

Shoya's single mother and the owner of a hair salon. She is upset at his son for bullying Shoko. She paid 1.7 million yen for all the hearing aids Shoya broke. When Shoya pays her back with the intention of killing himself afterwards, she reveals that she is aware of his plans, threatening to burn the money if he tries to kill himself again, thus leaving her with nothing. Unfortunately, she accidentally burns the money anyway. She cares for her granddaughter, Maria, as well as Shoya, and often lets Yuzuru stay around the house. After Shoya ends up in a coma, she feels awkward around Shouko, despite trying to remain polite, though the two get closer after Shoya wakes up. She is later shown to have befriended Yaeko Nishimiya, as well, often drinking with her together.

Shoya's best friend in elementary school, who helps him bully Shoko. When she moves away, Shimada places all the blame on Shoya and soon turns into the ringleader of the people bullying Shoya: frequently stealing his shoes, beating him up, and writing threats and cruel things on his desk in chalk every morning. Ueno wants Shoya and Shimada to be friends again and gets Shoya to the amusement park were Shimada is now working, but Shoya storms away, deciding he does not care about Shimada and does not want to be his friend again. When Shoya falls while saving Shouko, Shimada sees him and saves him from the river. However, Shoya never learns this because he is unconscious at that time, and Shimada asks Shouko, who is a witness, not to tell him about it. Even so, Ueno tells Shoya about what had happened anyway. Shimada is shown at the Coming of Age day, shortly before the manga's end.

Shoya's other best friend in elementary school who often goes alongside him in his "life-challenging activities". Like Shimada, Hirose cuts ties with Shoya after Shouko's transfer. Hirose stays close with Shimada (and possibly Ueno as well) after graduation and, along with him, brings Shoya from a river after he falls down from saving Shouko.

Shoya's teacher at elementary school. He is a shallow man who finds Shouko's presence in the school unfair to the other pupils. While he is disappointed in Shoya for bullying Shouko, he still laughs at the jokes made about her. After her transfer, he supports the class to turn Shoya into a scapegoat and refuses to believe him when he claims he is being bullied too. Years later, Shoya runs into Takeuchi again when looking for locations for the film. Takeuchi says that Shoya has grown into a fine young man and all the bad things in his past have changed Shoya for the better. Mashiba dislikes how Takeuchi talks about Shouko and throws his drink into Takeuchi's face, costing them the chance to film at the school, though with Shoya's later hospitalization and Mashiba's apology to him, Takeuchi allows them to shoot anyway.

Shoya's music teacher in elementary school. As Sahara is among the students, Kita is the only one among the teachers willing to get along with Shouko despite her deafness. She attempts to make the class learn sign language for Shouko's sake, but her proposal is rejected by Takeuchi and the class. Later, Kita also includes Shouko to take part in the school choir, but despite trying hard to teach her, Shouko ends up ruining the song and making the school lose the choir competition.

Shoya's young niece who lives with Shoya and his family. Maria is half-Japanese from her mother's side and half-Brazilian from her father's side. She gains a constant wonder about the difference between things that are dead and alive. After Shoya's fall, she fears he might be dead, so Yuzuru takes it upon herself to teach her the difference, being an expert on the matter.

Shoya's older sister. She is significantly older than him, as she already graduated from college when he is still in elementary school. Curiously, she is the only character with lines whose face is never seen; even her husband and daughter are shown and get more screen time than her. According to Shoya, his sister has dated numerous men, one of whom has a younger brother who was bullied by Shoya; this event probably led to his breakup with her. Later, she dates a Brazilian man named Pedro; this time, her relationship sticks, and she has a daughter, Maria, with him. The final chapter reveals that she is expecting her second child with Pedro.

Media

Manga
A Silent Voice began as a manga written and illustrated by Yoshitoki Ōima and was originally published as a one-shot in the February 2011 issue of Bessatsu Shōnen Magazine. It was later turned into a full manga series and began serialization in the combined 36-37th issue of Weekly Shōnen Magazine, released on August 7, 2013, and ended its run on the 51st issue of the magazine on November 19, 2014. The series was compiled into seven tankōbon volumes which were published by Kodansha in Japan between November 15, 2013, and December 17, 2014. Kodansha USA licensed the series for an English release in North America with the first volume being released in Q2 2015 and with subsequent volumes released every two months following. Crunchyroll Manga had earlier obtained the series for a digital English release. Kodansha Comics collected all seven volumes into a box set containing a poster and a replica of Shouko's notebook from the series, and released it on December 19, 2017.

The series is planned to be re-released in two hard cover collected editions featuring higher print quality and bonus segments. Book 1 will come out October 2021, and book 2 in 2022.

In addition, the series in also licensed in Taiwan by Tong Li Publishing, in South Korea by Daewon C.I., in France by Ki-oon, in Germany by Egmont Manga, in Italy by Star Comics, in Spain by Milky Way Ediciones, in Mexico by Panini Comics, in Argentina by Editorial Ivrea, in Brazil by NewPOP, in Russia by Istari Comics, in Thailand by Luckpim, in Indonesia by M&C!, in Malaysia by Gempak Starz, in Vietnam by Tre Publishing House, in Poland by Kotori, in Turkey by Satori and in the Czech Republic by Crew.

Volume list

Film

The final chapter of the manga, published in the 51st issue of Weekly Shōnen Magazine in 2014, announced that an anime project for the series was in its planning stages. The seventh volume of the manga revealed that the project would be a theatrical film. It was later revealed in early October 2015 that Kyoto Animation would be producing an anime film based on the series, directed by Naoko Yamada and distributed by Shochiku. It was announced on the adaptation's official website that Reiko Yoshida is writing the film's scripts, Futoshi Nishiya is designing the characters. The film was released in Japan on September 17, 2016.

The English language adaptation features a deaf voice actress named Lexi Cowden playing the one of the lead characters.

Reception
The first tankobon volume sold 31,714 copies within the first week of release, ranking number 19 on the Oricon manga chart. Its second volume ranked 12 selling 60,975 in its first week. As of March 2014, the tankobon volumes sold 700,000 copies in Japan; and over 2.5 million copies in Japan by April 2016. 

In France, A Silent Voice sold 131,000 copies in 2015 and 85,000 copies in 2016, adding up to 216,000 copies sold in France as of 2016.

Awards and nominations
A Silent Voice received an award for "Best Rookie Manga" in 2008. The vector of the content made it difficult for publication on any manga magazine until it was picked up after months of legal dispute by the February edition of Bessatsu Shounen Magazine, where it won first place. Due to the subject matter, the serialization has been reviewed and supported by the Japanese Federation of the Deaf. It was nominated for the 8th Manga Taishō.

In February 2015, Asahi Shimbun announced that A Silent Voice was one of nine nominees for the nineteenth annual Tezuka Osamu Cultural Prize. The manga went on to win the New Creator Prize. In April 2016, it was announced that A Silent Voice was nominated for the Best U.S. Edition of International Material-Asia award in the 2016 Eisner Awards.

References

External links
 

2011 manga
2013 manga
Drama anime and manga
Kodansha books
Kodansha franchises
Kodansha manga
Literature about deaf people
Manga adapted into films
Shōnen manga
Fiction about suicide
Winner of Tezuka Osamu Cultural Prize (New Artist Prize)
Works about atonement
Works about school bullying
Psychological drama television and other works